The men's 20 km individual competition of the 2015 Winter Universiade was held at the National Biathlon Centre in Osrblie on January 25.

Results

References 

Men's 20km